Casa Ferrario is a historic Art Nouveau building located on via Spadari #3-5 in Milan, Italy.

History 
It was designed by Ernesto Pirovano in the Liberty style and built between 1902 and 1904.

Description 
the building is most notable for the elaborate wrought iron balconies designed and made by Alessandro Mazzucotelli with floral and butterfly motifs. The interior stairwell is also made with wrought iron. The top floor has a frieze of fallen leaves. The four story apartment complex  rises alongside the Casa Vanoni and facing the Casa dell'Unione Cooperativa.

Gallery

Notes

Art Nouveau architecture in Milan
Houses completed in 1903
Buildings and structures in Milan
1903 establishments in Italy